In the human brain, the central lateral nucleus is a part of the anterior intralaminar nucleus in the thalamus. The intralaminar nuclei project to many different regions of the brain,  The thalamus acts generally as a relay point for the brain for other areas of the brain to link to. Where the central lateral nucleus acts as a vital role in consciousness. This area of the brain also affects conditioned emotional responses, such as fear conditioning.

References 

Neuroanatomy
Thalamic nuclei